John Hume  (18 January 19373 August 2020) was an Irish nationalist politician from Northern Ireland, widely regarded as one of the most important figures in the recent political history of Ireland, as one of the architects of the Northern Ireland peace process.

A native of Derry, he was a founding member of the Social Democratic and Labour Party (SDLP), and served as its second leader from 1979 to 2001. He also served as a Member of the European Parliament (MEP), and a Member of the UK Parliament (MP), as well as a member of the Northern Ireland Assembly (MLA).

Hume was co-recipient of the 1998 Nobel Peace Prize with David Trimble, and also received both the Gandhi Peace Prize and the Martin Luther King Award.  He is the only person to receive the three major peace awards.

In 2012, Pope Benedict XVI made Hume a Knight Commander of the Papal Order of St. Gregory the Great.
He was named "Ireland's Greatest" in a 2010 public poll by Irish national broadcaster RTÉ to find the greatest person in Ireland's history.

Early life and education

Hume was born in 1937 into a working-class Catholic family in Derry, the eldest of seven children of Anne "Annie" (née Doherty), a seamstress, and Samuel Hume, a shipyard worker. He had a mostly Irish Catholic background; though his surname derived from one of his great-grandfathers, a Scottish Presbyterian who migrated to County Donegal. Hume attended St Columb's College and went on to St Patrick's College, Maynooth, the leading Catholic seminary in Ireland and a recognised college of the National University of Ireland, where he intended to study for the priesthood. Among his teachers was Tomás Ó Fiaich, the future cardinal and Primate of All Ireland.

Hume did not complete his clerical studies but did obtain an M.A. degree in French and history from the college in 1958, and then returned home to his native Derry, where he became a teacher at his Alma mater, St Columb's College. He was a founding member of the Credit Union movement in the city and was chair of the University for Derry Committee in 1965, an unsuccessful fight to have Northern Ireland's second university established in Derry in the mid-1960s.

Hume became the youngest ever President of the Irish League of Credit Unions at age 27. He served in the role from 1964 to 1968. He once said that "all the things I've been doing, it's the thing I'm proudest of because no movement has done more good for the people of Ireland, north and south, than the credit union movement."

Hume became a leading figure in the civil rights movement in the late 1960s along with people such as Hugh Logue. Hume was a prominent figure in the Derry Citizens' Action Committee. The DCAC was set up in the wake of 5 October 1968 march through Derry which had caused much attention to be drawn towards the situation in Northern Ireland. The purpose of the DCAC was to make use of the publicity surrounding recent events to bring to light grievances in Derry that had been suppressed by the Unionist Government for years. The DCAC, unlike Northern Ireland Civil Rights Association (NICRA), was aimed specifically at a local campaign, improving the situation in Derry for everyone, and maintaining a peaceful stance.  The committee also had a Stewards Association that was there to prevent any violence at marches or sit-downs.

Political career

Hume became an Independent Nationalist member of the Parliament of Northern Ireland in 1969 at the height of the civil rights campaign. He was elected to the Northern Ireland Assembly in 1973, and served as Minister of Commerce in the short-lived power-sharing Executive in 1974. He stood unsuccessfully for the Westminster Parliament for the Londonderry constituency in October 1974, and was elected for Foyle in 1983.

In October 1971 he joined four Westminster MPs in a 48-hour hunger strike to protest at the internment without trial of hundreds of suspected Irish republicans. State papers that have been released under the 30 year rule that an Irish diplomat eight years later in 1979 believed Hume supported the return of internment.

In 1977, Hume challenged a regulation under the Civil Authorities (Special Powers) Act (Northern Ireland) 1922 which allowed any soldier to disperse an assembly of three or more people. The Lord Chief Justice of Northern Ireland, Lord Lowry, held that the regulation was ultra vires under Section 4 of the Government of Ireland Act 1920 which forbade the Parliament of Northern Ireland to make laws in respect of the army.

A founding member of the Social Democratic and Labour Party (SDLP), he succeeded Gerry Fitt as its leader in 1979.  He also served as one of Northern Ireland's three Members of the European Parliament and served on the faculty of Boston College, from which he received an honorary degree in 1995.

Hume was directly involved in secret talks with the British government and Sinn Féin, in an effort to bring Sinn Féin to the discussion table openly. The talks are speculated to have led directly to the Anglo-Irish Agreement in 1985.

The vast majority of unionists rejected the agreement and staged a massive and peaceful public rally in Belfast City Centre to demonstrate their distaste. Many Republicans and nationalists also rejected it, as they had seen it as not going far enough. Hume, however, continued dialogue with both governments and Sinn Féin. The "Hume–Adams process" eventually delivered the 1994 IRA ceasefire which ultimately provided the relatively peaceful backdrop against which the Good Friday agreement was brokered.

Reputation
Hume is credited as being the thinker behind many political developments in Northern Ireland, from the power-sharing Sunningdale Agreement to the Anglo-Irish Agreement and the Belfast Agreement. He won the Nobel Peace Prize in 1998 alongside the then-leader of the Ulster Unionist Party, David Trimble.

When Trimble became First Minister, it was expected that Hume would take the role of Deputy First Minister, being the leader of the second largest party, the SDLP. Instead, this role was handed to Séamus Mallon, also of the SDLP. Some political journalists cited a bad working relationship between Hume and Trimble, despite the two men collecting the Nobel Prize together.

On his retirement from the SDLP leadership in 2001, Hume was praised across the political divide, even by his long-time opponent, fellow MP and MEP, the Rev. Ian Paisley. Hume held the Tip O'Neill Chair in Peace Studies at the University of Ulster, currently funded by The Ireland Funds.

Retirement

On 4 February 2004, Hume announced his complete retirement from politics and was succeeded by Mark Durkan as SDLP leader.  He did not contest the 2004 European election (when his seat was won by Bairbre de Brún of Sinn Féin), nor did he run in the 2005 general election, in which Mark Durkan retained the Foyle constituency for the SDLP.

Hume and his wife, Pat, continued to be active in promoting European integration, issues around global poverty and the Credit Union movement. He was also a supporter of the Campaign for the Establishment of a United Nations Parliamentary Assembly, an organisation which campaigns for democratic reformation of the United Nations. In retirement, he continued to speak publicly, including a visit to Seton Hall University in New Jersey in 2005, the first Summer University of Democracy of the Council of Europe (Strasbourg, 10–14 July 2006), and at St Thomas University, Fredericton, New Brunswick, Canada, on 18 July 2007. A building added to the National University of Ireland, Maynooth, was named after him. Hume held the position of Club President of his local football team, Derry City F.C., which he supported all his life. He was a patron of the children's charity Plan International Ireland.

Personal life

In 1960, Hume married Patricia "Pat" Hone (22 February 19382 September 2021), a primary school teacher, whom he had first met two years earlier at a dancehall in Muff, County Donegal. The couple had five children - Thérèse, Áine, Aidan, John and Mo - as well as 16 grandchildren and two great-grandchildren.

Death

In 2015, Hume was diagnosed with Alzheimer's disease, of which he had first displayed symptoms in the late 1990s. Hume died in the early hours of 3 August 2020 at a nursing home in Derry, at the age of 83. On his death, former Labour leader and prime minister Tony Blair said: "John Hume was a political titan; a visionary who refused to believe the future had to be the same as the past." The Dalai Lama said on Twitter: "John Hume's deep conviction in the power of dialogue and negotiations to resolve conflict was unwavering... It was his leadership and his faith in the power of negotiations that enabled the 1998 Good Friday Agreement to be reached. His steady persistence set an example for us all to follow."

See also
List of peace activists

Awards and honours
 LL.D. (honoris causa), Boston College, 1995 (one of 44 honorary doctorates Hume was awarded)
 LL.D. (honoris causa), University College Galway, 1996
 Four Freedoms, Freedom of Speech Medal Recipient, 1996
 Golden Doves for Peace Journalistic Prize, 1997
 Nobel Prize for Peace (co-recipient), 1998
 Officier de Légion d’Honneur, France, 1999
 Martin Luther King Award, 1999
 Blessed are the Peacemakers Award from Catholic Theological Union, 2000
 International Gandhi Peace Prize, 2001
 Golden Plate Award of the American Academy of Achievement, 2002
 Freedom of two cities; Derry City in 2000 & Cork in 2004
 Honorary D.Litt., St. Thomas University, Fredericton, N.B., 2007
 Honorary Patron, University Philosophical Society, Trinity College Dublin, 2007
 Ireland's Greatest (public poll conducted by RTÉ), 2010
 Knight of Saint Gregory, 2012

Further reading
 Denis Haughey and Sean Farren, 'John Hume: Irish Peacemaker,' Four Courts Press, Dublin, 2015 
 John Hume, 'Personal views, politics, peace and reconciliation in Ireland,' Town House, Dublin, 1996. 
 John Hume, ‘Derry beyond the walls: social and economic aspects of the growth of Derry,' Ulster Historical foundation, Belfast, 2002. 
 Barry White, 'John Hume: a statesman of the troubles,' Blackstaff, Belfast, 1984 
 George Drower, 'John Hume: peacemaker,' Gollancz, 1995 
 George Drower, 'John Hume: man of peace,' Vista, London, 1996 
 Paul Routledge, 'John Hume: a biography,' Harper-Collins, London, 1997 
 Gerard Murray, 'John Hume and the SDLP: impact and survival in Northern Ireland,' Irish Academic Press, Dublin, 1998.

Quotes

 "Over the years, the barriers of the past—the distrust and prejudices of the past—will be eroded, and a new society will evolve, a new Ireland based on agreement and respect for difference."
 "I thought that I had a duty to help those that weren't as lucky as me."

References

External links
 
  including the Nobelprize Lecture on 10 December 1998
 Hume's Address to the College Historical Society of Trinity College Dublin, on Northern Ireland
 Tip O'Neill Chair in Peace Studies at the University of Ulster
 
 
 

1937 births
2020 deaths
Knights Commander of the Order of St Gregory the Great
Officiers of the Légion d'honneur
Leaders of the Social Democratic and Labour Party
British cooperative organizers
UK MPs 1983–1987
UK MPs 1987–1992
UK MPs 1992–1997
UK MPs 1997–2001
UK MPs 2001–2005
MEPs for Northern Ireland 1979–1984
MEPs for Northern Ireland 1984–1989
MEPs for Northern Ireland 1989–1994
MEPs for Northern Ireland 1994–1999
MEPs for Northern Ireland 1999–2004
Social Democratic and Labour Party MEPs
People from Northern Ireland of Scottish descent
Members of the Northern Ireland Forum
Members of the House of Commons of Northern Ireland 1969–1973
Members of the Northern Ireland Assembly 1973–1974
Members of the Northern Ireland Constitutional Convention
Northern Ireland MPAs 1982–1986
Northern Ireland MLAs 1998–2003
Members of the Parliament of the United Kingdom for County Londonderry constituencies (since 1922)
Recipients of the Gandhi Peace Prize
Nobel Peace Prize laureates
Nobel laureates from Northern Ireland
Politicians from Derry (city)
People of The Troubles (Northern Ireland)
Alumni of St Patrick's College, Maynooth
Deaths from Alzheimer's disease
Social Democratic and Labour Party MPs (UK)
People educated at St Columb's College
Members of the House of Commons of Northern Ireland for County Londonderry constituencies
Executive ministers of the 1974 Northern Ireland Assembly
Social Democratic and Labour Party members of the House of Commons of Northern Ireland
Social Democratic and Labour Party MLAs
Independent members of the House of Commons of Northern Ireland
Recipients of the Four Freedoms Award
Deaths from dementia in Northern Ireland